This is a list of cardiology mnemonics, categorized and alphabetized. For mnemonics in other medical specialities, see this list of medical mnemonics.

Aortic regurgitation: causes
CREAM:

Congenital

Rheumatic damage

Endocarditis

Aortic dissection/ Aortic root dilatation

Marfan’s

Aortic stenosis characteristics
SAD:p. 29

Syncope

Angina

Dyspnoea

Aortic to right Subclavian path
ABC'Sp. 1

Aortic arch gives rise to:

Brachiocephalic trunk

Left Common Carotid

Left Subclavian

Heart valves (right to left)
Toilet Paper My Ass, or They Pay Me Alcohol, or "T"hugs "P"ush "Me" "A"round. 

Tricuspid valve

Pulmonary semilunar valve

Mitral (bicuspid) valve

Aortic semilunar valve

Apex beat: abnormalities found on palpation, causes of impalpable
HILT:p. 29

Heaving

Impalpable

Laterally displaced

Thrusting/ Tapping

If it's impalpable, causes are COPD:p. 29

COPD

Obesity

Pleural, Pericardial effusion

Dextrocardia

Atrial Arrhythmias
Anticoagulants: To prevent embolization.

Beta blockers: To block the effects of certain hormones on the heart to slow the heart rate.

Calcium Channel Blockers: Help slow the heart rate by blocking the number of electrical impulses that pass through the AV node into the lower heart chambers (ventricles).

Digoxin: Helps slow the heart rate by blocking the number of electrical impulses that pass through the AV node into the lower heart chambers (ventricles).

Electrocardioversion: A procedure in which electric currents are used to reset the heart's rhythm back to regular pattern.

Atrial Fibrillation causes
Pirates:p. 3

Pulmonary: PE, COPD

Iatrogenic

Rheumatic heart: mitral regurgitation

Atherosclerotic: MI, CAD

Thyroid: hyperthyroid

Endocarditis

Sick sinus syndrome

Atrial fibrillation management
ABCD:p. 30

Anti-coagulate

Beta-block to control rate

Cardiovert

Digoxin

Beck's triad (cardiac tamponade)
3 D's:p. 30

Diminished heart sounds

Distended jugular veins

Decreased arterial pressure

Betablockers: cardioselective betablockers
Betablockers Acting Exclusively At Myocardium:p. 30

Betaxolol

Acebutelol

Esmolol

Atenolol

Metoprolol

CHF Treatment
LMNOP

Lasix

Morphine

Nitrites

Oxygen

VassoPressors

CHF: causes of exacerbation
FAILUREp. 30

Forgot medication

Arrhythmia/ Anaemia

Ischemia/ Infarction/ Infection

Lifestyle: taken too much salt

Upregulation of CO: pregnancy, hyperthyroidism

Renal failure

Embolism: pulmonary

Complications of Myocardial Infarction 
Darth Vader

Death

Arrythmia

Rupture(free ventricular wall/ ventricular septum/ papillary muscles)

Tamponade

Heart failure (acute or chronic)

Valve disease

Aneurysm of Ventricles

Dressler's Syndrome

thromboEmbolism (mural thrombus)

Recurrence/ mitral Regurgitation

Coronary artery bypass graft: indications
DUST:p. 31

Depressed ventricular function

Unstable angina

Stenosis of the left main stem

Triple vessel disease

ECG: left vs. right bundle block
WiLLiaM MaRRoW:p. 31

W pattern in V1-V2 and M pattern in V3-V6 is Left bundle block.

M pattern in V1-V2 and W in V3-V6 is Right bundle block.

Exercise ramp ECG: contraindications
RAMP:p. 31

Recent MI

Aortic stenosis

MI in the last 7 days

Pulmonary hypertension

Endocarditis
FROM JANE:

Fever

Roth's spots

Osler's nodes

Murmur of heart

Janeway lesions

Anemia
 Nail hemorrhage

Emboli

Heart valve sequence
Try Puling My Aorta:p. 3

Tricuspid

Pulmonary

Mitral (bicuspid)

Aorta

Heart blocks
If the R is far from P,
then you have a First Degree.

Longer, longer, longer, drop!
Then you have a Wenkebach.

if some P's don't get through,
then you have Mobitz II.

If P's and Q's don't agree, then you have a Third Degree.

Infarctions
INFARCTIONSp. 34

IV access

Narcotic analgesics (e.g. morphine, pethidine)

Facilities for defibrillation (DF)

Aspirin/ Anticoagulant (heparin)

Rest

Converting enzyme inhibitor

Thrombolysis

IV beta blocker

Oxygen 60%

Nitrates

Stool Softeners

JVP: wave form
ASK MEp. 32

Atrial contraction

Systole (ventricular contraction)

Klosure (closure) of tricuspid valve, so atrial filling

Maximal atrial filling

Emptying of atrium

MI: basic management
BOOMAR:p. 32

Bed rest

Oxygen

Opiate

Monitor

Anticoagulate

Reduce clot size

MI: signs and symptoms
PULSE:p. 32

Persistent chest pains

Upset stomach

Lightheadedness

Shortness of breath

Excessive sweating

MI: therapeutic treatment
O BATMAN!p. 32

Oxygen

Beta blocker

ASA

Thrombolytics (e.g. heparin)

Morphine

Ace prn

Nitroglycerin

MI: treatment of acute MI
COAG:p. 32

Cyclomorph

Oxygen

Aspirin

Glycerol trinitrate

Murmur attributes
"IL PQRST" (person has ill PQRST heart waves):p. 32

Intensity

Loccasion

Pitch

Quality

Radiation

Shape

Timing

Murmurs: innocent murmur features
8 S's:p. 32

Soft

Systolic

Short

Sounds (S1 & S2) normal

Symptomless

Special tests normal (X-ray, EKG)

Standing/ Sitting (vary with position)

Sternal depression

Murmurs: louder with inspiration vs expiration
LEft sided murmurs louder with Expiration

RIght sided murmurs louder with Inspiration.p. 32

Murmurs: questions to ask
SCRIPT:p. 32

Site

Character (e.g. harsh, soft, blowing)

Radiation

Intensity

Pitch

Timing

Murmurs: systolic vs. diastolic
PASS:Pulmonic & Aortic

Stenosis=Systolic.

PAID: Pulmonic & Aortic

Insufficiency=Diastolic.p. 32

Pericarditis: causes
CARDIAC RIND:p. 34

Collagen vascular disease

Aortic aneurysm

Radiation

Drugs (such as hydralazine)

Infections

Acute renal failure

Cardiac infarction

Rheumatic fever

Injury

Neoplasms

Dressler's syndrome

Pericarditis: EKG
PericarditiS:p. 34

PR depression in precordial leads.

ST elevation.

Peripheral vascular insufficiency: inspection criteria
SICVD:p. 34

Symmetry of leg musculature

Integrity of skin

Color of toenails

Varicose veins

Distribution of hair

Pulseless electrical activity: causes
PATCH MED:p. 34

Pulmonary embolus

Acidosis

Tension pneumothorax

Cardiac tamponade

Hypokalemia/ Hyperkalemia/ Hypoxia/ Hypothermia/ Hypovolemia

Myocardial infarction

Electrolyte derangements

Drugs

ST elevation causes in ECG
ELEVATION:p. 34

Electrolytes

LBBB

Early repolarization

Ventricular hypertrophy

Aneurysm

Treatment (e.g. pericardiocentesis)

Injury (AMI, contusion)

Osborne waves (hypothermia)

Non-occlusive vasospasm

Supraventricular tachycardia: treatment

ABCDE:p. 35

Adenosine

Beta-blocker

Calcium channel antagonist

Digoxin

Excitation (vagal stimulation)

Ventricular tachycardia: treatment
LAMB:p. 35

Lidocaine

Amiodarone

Mexiltene/ Magnesium

Beta-blocker

White Blood Cell Count
Never let monkeys eat bananas:

Neutrophils

lymphocytes

monocytes

eosinophils

basophils

References

cardio Mnemonics
+cardio
+